

Cyneferth (or Cynefrith) was a medieval Bishop of Rochester. He was consecrated between 909 and 926. He died between January 933 and May 934.

Citations

References

External links
 

Bishops of Rochester
10th-century English bishops
10th-century deaths
Year of birth missing